The GS1 GEPIR (Global Electronic Party Information Registry) is a distributed database that contains basic information on over 1,000,000 companies in over 100 countries. The database can be searched by GTIN code (includes UPC and EAN-13 codes), container Code (SSCC), location number (GLN), and (in some countries) the company name. A SOAP webservice exists.

GEPIR had about 600.000 members in 72 countries. In 2012 this increased to more than 1M members in more than 100 countries. In 2013, all 111 member organisations joined GEPIR.

Accessibility 

GEPIR is accessible for free in almost all countries but the number of request per day is limited (from 20 to 30).
Since October 2013, GS1 France restricts access to GEPIR to companies (registration with SIREN code is required to use it).

A premium access have been created by GS1 France in January 2010  and allows companies to use GS1 web and SOAP interface without any limit.

System Architecture 
GEPIR is a lookup service coordinated by the GS1 GO that provides all end users with the ability to look up information about GS1 Identification Keys.

Depending on the service, systems are provided by GS1 Member Organisations (MOs) or 3rd party service providers, or both. Where a GS1 MO does not choose to provide the service directly to its end users, the GS1 Global Office may provide the service for that geography. Some services involve a technical component deployed by the GS1 Global Office that coordinates the systems provided by GS1 MOs and/or 3rd party service providers. 
The GEPIR service is provided by systems deployed by GS1 MOs, with the GS1 GO providing a central point of coordination to federate the local systems. The GS1 GO also provides the MO-level service for MOs that cannot or do not wish to deploy their own system.

References

External links
GEPIR GO (Global Office) - Webpage (Worldwide)
GEPIR US - Webpage (US) (error 404 Not Found as of 8 March 2021)

Barcodes

Databases